The Weidenfeld-Hoffmann Trust.  is an educational charity founded by the late Lord Weidenfeld and André Hoffmann in 2014. The Weidenfeld-Hoffmann Trust runs the Weidenfeld-Hoffmann Scholarships and Leadership Programme at the University of Oxford. The Trust awards around thirty-five scholarships each year for high calibre graduates and early career professionals from developing and emerging economies to study at Oxford.  The aim of the programme is to provide the knowledge, skills and network to enhance talent and create opportunities for future global leaders. The Weidenfeld-Hoffmann and Oxford-Hoffmann Scholarships are the largest philanthropic scholarships supported by the University of Oxford. Since 2007 over 400 scholarships have been awarded to recipients from around 100 different countries.

Founding and supporters 
George Weidenfeld,of Chelsea GBE,   a distinguished publisher   founded  the Weidenfeld Scholarships and Leadership Programme at the Institute of Strategic Dialogue in London.  In 2014 the Weidenfeld-Hoffmann Trust was established, and an Endowment Fund was launched in 2015, in honour of his 95th Birthday.    Oxford University contributed 40% of the funds with 60% donated by supporters and friends.  In 2021 the   Trust was made a member of the Chancellor's Court of Benefactors in recognition of its significant contribution to the University of Oxford. The  Trust also supports scholarships through partnerships with the Louis Dreyfus Foundation, the Hualan Education Group and Chevening UK and with individual Oxford Colleges including Hertford College, Keble College, Lincoln College, Mansfield College, St Edmund Hall, Trinity College, and Worcester College.  Previous partnerships have included  the Annenberg Foundation, Arcadia Fund and  Fondation Hoffmann.

Eligibility and selection 

Scholarships are open to exceptional graduates and early-stage professionals from emerging and developing economies who intend to return to their countries once their studies are complete. Around 35 1-year master's courses are supported mainly from the social sciences  . The scholarship covers 100% of course fees, a full grant for living costs and the costs of the Leadership Programme.

Humanitas Programme 
The  Trust was also home to the Humanitas Programme, (2010-2020) a network of Visiting Professorships run in partnership with the University of Oxford, the Oxford Research Centre in the Humanities (TORCH) and the University of Cambridge (CRASSH). The Programme invited experts and practitioners from around the world on short-term visiting professorships, to address major themes in the arts, humanities and social sciences Its illustrated lecture and masterclass by pianist Mitsuko Uchida has been viewed nearly 300,000 times

References

External links 

 www.example.com

Educational charities based in the United Kingdom